Majid Salehi (born September 17, 1975) is an Iranian actor, screenwriter and producer. He has received various accolades, including a Hafez Award, in addition to nominations for a Crystal Simorgh, four Hafez Awards, an Iran Cinema Celebration Awards and an Iran's Film Critics and Writers Association Awards.

Career 
Seyed Majid Salehi was born in Amin Al-Molk St. (Emamzadeh Hassan), Tehran. After graduating in mathematics and physics at the age of eighteen, he attended the acting classes of Hamid Samandarian at Rassam Honar Acting Institute and pursued this career seriously.

In an interview made with him by Fereidoun Jayrani on Dec. 16, 2017 in the live program of “Thirty-five”, Majid Salehi told about many parts of his life and also about the films and TV series in which he had played.

He started his art career by acting in “Dr. Jooshkar” and “Antigone” plays. Then, he continued with TV, and he wrote, acted, and directed various TV series, often with child and humor themes. Soon he became famous with the “Majid Delbandam” character, and this process continued with other programs. When Hamid Jebelli's withdrew from “Yeki Bood, Yeki Nabood”, he became his substitute, and that film became his first attempt to enter the field of cinema. In addition to acting in some of the TV series, he has also undertaken writing and directing. Most of the films in which Salehi has played a role were among the bestseller movies. Movies such as “Dog Day Afternoon”, “the Singles”, “the 40-year-old Single”, etc. indicate that he is a trustworthy and of course, a popular actor. As he himself says, he is a lucky actor. He has also produced a few short films.

He graduated from Tehran Faculty of Arts and Architecture at the bachelor's degree of Theater Acting and Directing in 2001, and obtained his master's degree in 2015 in the same field and from the same university. Currently, he teaches at Andisheh Mahan Cultural and Art Institute under the supervision of Amir Dezhakam.

Artistic  Event

Filmography

Film

As director

Web

TV Film

TV series

Theatre

Awards and nominations

Social Activities

References

External links 
 
 
 

1975 births
Living people
Iranian male actors
Iranian male stage actors
Iranian male film actors
Iranian male writers
Iranian film directors
Iranian television directors